Hussigny-Godbrange (Luxembourgish: Héiséng-Gueberéng; German: Hussingen-Godbringen) is a commune in the Meurthe-et-Moselle department in north-eastern France. It lies near the border with Luxembourg.

Hussigny-Godbrange is a historic center of Italian immigration in France. Therefore, it was called "Little Italy."

See also
Communes of the Meurthe-et-Moselle department

References

Hussignygodbrange